The Shan State, a state of Myanmar (also known as Burma), was once made up of a large number of traditional monarchies or fiefdoms. These are collectively known as Shan States.

Ranks of rulers
Three ranks of chiefs were recognized by the King of Burma and later by the British administration.  These ranks were:
Saopha (Shan for king or chieftain) or Sawbwa (in Burmese)
Myosa  (Myoza), "duke" or chief of town.
Ngwegunhmu, silver revenue chief.

Hierarchy and precedence 

The distinction in the titles dates from the days of the Burmese monarchy although the same states have not continued to hold the same titles for their chiefs during the centuries -- changes took place according to royal favour, results of battles and later, the decisions of the British authorities.  The privileges and titles were so much a matter of royal ordinance that every one of a Sawbwa's symbols of power was laid down in a special book of dispensations granted by the higher court. His regalia and clothes, the guilding and jewel decoration of betel boxes, spittoons, fly-whisks and such articles of use, the dress of ministers, the umbrellas, spears and horses in procession, the caparisoning of the royal elephant, the instruments for processional music, the gateways and the style of residence, all were rigidly prescribed to ensure that the dignity kept up accordance with the status of a royal chieftain, yet did not encroach on the special privileges reserved for the court of Ava itself. The British, whose success in administration was largely bound up with observance, of precedence in a hierarchy, listed states also as Sawbaships, Myosaships and Ngwegunhmuships.

The following lists the Sawbwas in order of the precedence, at the time of the British annexation of the Shan States.

Shan states

Maw (Baw)
Last Sawbwa – Sao Hkun Aung

Hopong (Hopon)

Rulers (title Ngwegunhmu)

 1783–1818 Hkun Kya
 1818–1833 Hkun Sin
 1833–184 Hkun Nun
 1845 Hkun La
 1845–1851 Hkun Lin
 1851–1885 Hkun Ti

Rulers (title Myoza)

 1885–1893 Hkun Wara
 1893–1900 Hkun Tse
 1900–1952 Hkun Law                           (b. 1896 - d. ....)

Hsahtung (Thaton)
 1781-? Hkun Samu
 ? Descendants of Hkun Samu
 1839 – ? Hkun Kyaw Le
 ?
 ? – 1905 Hkun Law
 1905–1930 Sao Hkun Sing
 1930–1957 Sao Hkun Kyi
 1957–1959 Sao Aung Myint

Hsamönghkam (Thamaingkan)
Founded before 1700 and under a Myosa, its known rulers were:
 1807–18.. Maung Shwe Pon
 1825–1834 Maung Shwe E (1st time)
 1834–18.. Maung Me (1st time)
 18..–1847 Maung Shwe E (2nd time)
 1847–1848 Maung Me (2nd time)
 1848–1867 Maung Shwe Min (1st time)
 1867 Maung Lin (1st time)
 1867–18.. Maung Tha U
 18..–1876 Maung Kyi
 1876–18.. Maung Lin (2nd time)
 18..–1885 Maung Su Ka
 1885–1886 Maung Shwe Min (2nd time)
 1886–19.. Maung Hpo
Last – Sao Htun Aye aka. Aungban Sawbwa

Hsawnghsup (Thaungdut)
Founded before 1858 under a Saopha, it ceased to exist in 1893. The rulers were:

Saophas 
1560 - 1580 Sao Hseng Myin 
1580 - 1612 Sao Maung Lwin 
1612 - 1628 Sao Shwe Yi 
1628 - 1650 Sao Khan Möng 
1650 - 1659 Sao Shwe Wad 1st time
1659 - 1663 Sao Moud Aung 
1663 - 1689 Sao Shwe Wad 2nd time 
1689 - 1703 Sao Hpo Gyi 
1703 - 1727 Sao Yi Khan Hpa Sunt Aung 
1727 - 1746 Sao Chow Piam Hpa  
1746 - 1757 Sao Hseng Tern Möng 
1757 - 1760 Sao Khan Hpo            (d. 1760)
1760 - .... Sao Hseng Sunt Hpa Wad Möng 
.... - .... Sao Pon Khone Gyi
.... - 1782 Sao Hti Kyaung
1782 - 1813 Sao Haw Nga
1813 - 1827 Sao Leik Hkam
1827 - 1834 Sao Aung Ba -Regent
1834 - 22 Oct 1880 Sao Shwe Maung
1880 - 1893 Sao Nyi Khant
1893 - 1899 Sao Khan Mun   
1899 - 1910 Sao Myat Htan (b. 1860) 
1910 - 1959 Sao Hkun Hsawng

Hsenwi (Theinni)
Hsenwi sets its legendary foundation before 650. It was ruled by a Saopha and ceased to exist in March 1888, when it was split into North Hsenwi and South Hsenwi. The rulers were: 
 731 – ? Hkun Tai Hkam 
 957 – 958 Hkun Hseng Ai Hom 
 ? – 1150 Hkun Yi Hkam Daing 
 1150 – 1201 Hkun Hso Hkwan Hpa (Hkun Yi Kang Hkam) he assassinated his younger brother Hkun Hsam Long Hpa the sawbwa of Mogaung because he doubt his younger brother will be betray him 
 1201 – 1204 Hkun Saw Yiam Hpa moved to Ta Sob Oo 
 1204 – ? Hkun Tai Yiam Hpa 
 ? – 1274 Hkun Ngok Sieng Hpa 
 1274 – 1276 Hkun Hso Hom Hpa (Ai Hpoo Hkam) 
 1276 – 1279 Hkun Hkam Tap Hpa
 1279 – 1318 Hkun Hkam Tep Hpa 
 1319 – 1349 Sao San Nwe 1319-1349 
 1349 – 1374 Hso Yeab Hpa  
 1373 – 1389 Sao Thet Hpa  
 1389 – 1392 Hkam Piam Hpa  (second son of Sao Thet Hpa) 
 1392 – 1394 Hkam Perd Hpa (third son of Sao Thet Hpa) 
 1395 – 1405 Nang Hpa Hom Möng (She managed her daughter Nang Hkam Hung married with her younger brother Sao Nwe San Hpa and ordered him to be the Saopha of Hsipaw) 
 1405 – 1428 Hkam Hkaing Hpa  
 1428 – 1440 Hkam Hord Hpa 
 1440 – 1460 Hkam Wad Hpa 
 1460 – 1523 Hkam Heeb Hpa 
 1523 – 1543 Hkam Hsen Hpa 
 1543 – 1549 Hkam Harn Hpa
 1549 – 1561 Hkam Pak Hpa
 1565 – 1593 Hsen Kyunt Hpa
 1593 – 1604 Hkam Hkaing Hpa 
 1604 – 1605 Hkam Hsue and Hkam Nan (the both rulers) 
 1601 – 1605 Hkam Ruea On (Hkam Hkaing Nwe) 
 1605 – 1644 Hso Hong Hpa
 1644 – 1650 Hso Kaw Hpa 
 1650 – 1683 Hso Hom Hpa 
 1683 – 1686 Se U III -Regent (1st time)
 1686 – 1721 Hso Hung Hpa
 1721   Se U III -Regent (2nd time)
 1721 – 1724 Han Hpa Hko Hkam Hung -Regent
 1724 – 1730 Hpawng Mong Long Hsung Wat
 1730   Mong Hkam -Regent
 1730   Hkam Hong -Regent (1st time)
 1730 – 1746 Sao Hkam Hsawng Hpa
 1746   Hkam Hong -Regent (2nd time)
 1746 – c.1747 Sao Hkun Hseng Hong
 c.1747 – 1750 Mahadevi Wing Hsup Pang -Regent
 1750   Hkam Hong -Regent (3rd time)
 1750 – 1751 Sao Mang Te
 1751 – 1752 Hkam Hong -Regent (4th time)
 1752 – 1761 Vacant
 1761 – 1767 Hkun Hseng Awng Tun
 1767 – 1770 Myauk Win Hmu -Regent
 1770 – 1772 Sayawadi Wun
 1772 – 1773 Sety-taw Wun
 1773 – 1775 U Teng Pong Nya
 1775 – 1775 Vacant
 1778 – 1800 Sao Hswe Cheng (Kon)
 1800   Hsup Pang -Regent
 1800 – 1815 Sao Hsö Kaw
 1815 – 1819 Mogaung Wun -Regent
 1819 – 1821 Sao Naw Möng
 1821 – 1824 Hkun Hkam Hkawt
 1824 – 1827 Sao Hkam Pak
 1827 – 1831 Sao Hkam Nan
 1831 – 1838 Sao Hkun Maung Lek
 1838 – 1845 Sao Hkam Leng (Hsö Hkan Hpa) (d. 1847)
 1845 – 1848 Sao Hseng Naw Hpa (1st time) (d. 1864)
 1848 – 1853 Vacant
 1853 – 1855 Sao Hseng Naw Hpa (2nd time)
 1855 – 1858 Vacant
 1858 – 1860 Sao Hpa Mawng Hpa (1st time) (d. 1891)
 1860 – 1863 Vacant
 1863 – 1864 Sao Hpa Mawng Hpa (2nd time) (s.a.)
 1864 – 1866 Shwe Pyi Bo
 1866 – 1867 U Ma Nga
 1867 – 1869 Sao Hseng Naw Hpa (3rd time) (s.a.)
 1869 – 1873 Vacant
 1873 – 1874 Win Hmu
 1874 – 1875 Sao Hseng Naw Hpa (4th time) (s.a.)
 1875 – 1876 Natsu Letya
 1876 – 1879 Sao Hseng Naw Hpa (5th time) (s.a.)
 1879 – Mar 1888 Hkun Hsang Tone Hung (b. 1852 – d. 1915)

North Hsenwi
Created in March 1888 from Hsenwi state.  the main state was split into two, North and South Hsenwi.
 Mar 1888 – x Hkun Hsang Tone Hung
 1927 – 1959 Sao Hom Hpa

South Hsenwi
Created in March 1888 by the splitting of the Hsenwi state.  The state is also known as Mong Yai. The rulers were:
 1888 – 1913 Sao Naw Möng
 1913 – 1946 Hso Hsawng Hpa 
 1946 – 1959 Hso Hom Hpa

Hsihkip (Thigyit)
Founded before 600, it ceased to exist in 1886, when it was incorporated into Yawnghwe. It was ruled by a Myosa and the rulers were:
 1459–1501 Hso Kyen Möng 
 1501–1515 Hso Hsaad Möng 
 1515–1542 Paw Hom Long  
 1542–1561 Hso Kyan Hpa  
 1561–1577 Sao Taan Möng 
 1577–1588 Sao Nga Möng 
 1588–1615 Sao Mwe Pung 
 1615–1653 Pawng Möng Lung Sung  
 1653–1677 Sao Hla Mak Sa Kone 
 1677–1700 Sao Houn Nwe 
 1700–1725 Sao Houn Möng 
 1725–1734 Vacant 
 1734–1746 Mai Sung Hka 
 1746–1757 Haw Sung Möng 
 1757–1764 Mai Ngaan Möng 
 1764–1782 Ok Mai Wad 
 1782–1800 Ok Mai Nge 
 1800?                      Hkun Chok
 18..–18.. Hkun Hpe
 18..–18.. Hkun Daw
 18..–18.. Maung Paw
 18..–18.. Maung Paik
 18..–18.. Hkun Hmom
 18..–18.. Hkam Lin -Regent
 184.–184. Hkun Nyun
 184.–1848 Twet Kye -Regent
 1848–1851 Hkun Ywe
 1851–1862 Hkun Ton
 1863–1870 Son Hkun Hpon
 1870–1886 Maung Hnya

Hsipaw (Thibaw)
Founded, according to legend, in 58 BC, it was ruled by a Saopha. Its formal name was Dutawadi. For the state capital see Thibaw. 

 58 BC Sao Hkun Hkam Saw 1st 
 Sao Hkun Hkam Naw 2nd 
 Sao Hkun Hkam Hko 3rd
 165–201 Sao Hkun Hkam Pan 8th   
 201–250 Paw Aik Phyao 9th 
 250–252 Awk Ai Lung 10th 
 Paw Pan (Sao Hpa Lung Hkam Pan) 11th
 Hso Pan Hpa 12th (son of Hso Hom Hpa, the saopha of Möng Mao
 957 Hkun Tai Hkam 
 1058 Hso Oom Hpa 38th 
 1395–1410 Nwe San Hpa 
 1410–1424 Sao Hkem Hpa  
 1424–1439 Hso Kawng Hpa 52nd 
 1439–1460 Sao Hsan Hpa 
 1460–1473 Hkam Yat Hpa 
 1473–1488 Sao Yak Hpa 
 1488–1500 Hso Bok Hpa 
 1500–1541 Sao Tammara  
 1541–1542 Sao Hkun Naing (son of Sao Tammara) 
 1542–1552 Hso Hom Hpa (son of Sao Hkun Naing) 
 1552–1557 Hso Yeam Hpa (son of Hso Hom Hpa) 
 1557–1564 Hso Klang Hpa (son of Hso Hom Hpa) 
 1564–1577 Hso Saw Hpa 62th (son of Hso Hom Hpa) 
 1577–1593 Hso Kaw Hpa 63th (son of Sao Hkun Naing ex-saopha of Mongpai and ex-King Mobye Narapati of Ava) 
 1593–1626 Tap Hseng Hkam 
 1626–1650 Hkun Hkam Hlaing 65th (son of Tap Hseng Hkam) 
 1650–1675 Hsen Tai San Wei  
 1675–1702 Hso Waing Hpa 
 1702–1714 Sao Okka Wara
 1714–1718 Sao Okka Seya
 1718–1722 Sao Sam Myo
 1722–1752 Sao Hkun Neng
 1752–1767 Sawra Tawta 
 1767–1788 Sao Myat San Te
 1788–1809 Sao Hswe Kya
 1809–1843 Sao Hkun Hkwi
 1843–1853 Sao Hkun Paw
 1853–1858 Sao Kya Htun (d. 1866)
 1858–1866 Hkun Myat Than 
 1866–1886 Sao Kya Hkeng	(deposed 1882-86) (d. 1902) 
 Mar 1886–8 May 1902 Sao Hkun Hseng
 8 May 1902–May 1928 Sao Hkun Hke (b. 1872 - d. 1928) (from 2 Jan 1928, Sir Sao Hke)
 1928–Jul 1938	I Sao Ohn Kya (b. 1893 - d. 1938)
 1938–1947 administered by British India
 1947–1959 Sao Kya Hseng (b. 1924 - d. 1962)

Kehsi Mansam (Kyithi Bansan)

 1860–1881 Hkun Yawt
 1881–.... Hkun Yawt Seng

Kengcheng (Kyaingchaing)

 1813–18xx Hpaya Möng Hkon

Kenghkam (Kyaingkan)

Myosas:
 1811–1854 Bodaw Sao Hkam Yi
 1855–1864 Sao Hkun Mwe
 1864–1870 Naw Hkam Leng
 1870–1874 Incorporated into Möngnai
 1874–1878 Sao Hkun Long
 1878–1882 Incorporated into Möngnai
 1882–188. Sao Naw Süng
 188.–19.. Hkun Un

Kenglön (Kyainglon)

Myosas: 
 1857–1873 Maung Pwin
 1873–1874 Naw Hkam U
 1874–1888 Hkun Tawn
 1888–19.. Hkun Mawng

Kengtung (Kyaingtong)
For the state capital see Kengtung.
 1243–1247 Mang Khum (Delegate of Mang Rai, founder of Kengtung State)
 1247–1253 Mang Khian
 1253–1264 Sao Nam Tuam 
 1264–1317 Sao Nam Nan 
 1317–1324 Sao Hsam Muen Hwe
 1324–1336 Sao Ai Lok  
 1342–1350 Sao Hsai Nan
 1349–1366 Sao Hsai Yu 
 1379–1387 Sao Sit Pan Tu
 1387–1390 Sao Ai Awn
 1390–1403 Ai Wu 
 1403–1460 Yi Hkam Hka
 1416–1441 Sao Hsam
 1441–1456 Sao Hsam si-li
 1456–1474 Ai Lao Hkam Ta 
 1474–1501 Hpaya Lao 
 Sao Naw Kiao (son of Ai Lao Hkam)
 Hsai Hkaw (son of Ai Lao Hkam)
 Hsai Hpom (son of Ai Lao Hkam)
 Sao Hsam (son of Ai Lao Hkam)
 Sao Hkam Mu (son of Ai Lao Hkam)
 1523–1560 Hpaya Kiao (a monk called to rule) aka Sao Town Hkam Fu 
 1560–1598 Sao Kiao Bun Nam 
 1598–1620 Sao Hkam Town  
 1620–1637 Sao Mong Khet (Hso Hkam Saw Hpa) 
 1638–1661 Sao On 
 1662–1678 Sao In Hkam
 1678–1686 Sao Ram Muen aka Sao Ok Sighn 
 1686–1703 Sao Mong Saik aka Hsa Le Mang 
 1703–1710 Sao Hsam Hpi 
 1710–1728 Sao Mong Chuen 
 1730–1737 Maung Myo (Yawnghwe Shan sent from Ava)
 1737–1738 Sao Mong Phi 
 1740–1744 Sao Mong Hsam 1st 
 1744–1747 Sao Karng 
 1747–1787 Sao Mong Hsam 2nd 
 1787–1802 Sao Kawng Tai
 1813–1857 Sao Maha Hkanan aka Sao Dong Hseng  
 1857–1876 Sao Maha Hpom
 1876–1881 Sao Hseng Hkam 
 1881–1886 Sao Kawng Tai
 1886–1897 Sao Kawng Hkam Fu 
 1895–1935 Sao Kawng Kiao Intaleng
 1935–1937 Sao Kawng Tai
 1937–1959 Sao Sai Long

Kokang
Ruled and founded by the Yang dynasty, it was founded in 1739 by Yang Shien Tsai, Chief of Shin Da Hu. Later his successor Yang Wei Shin expanded his territory and renamed it Kho Kan Shan. Yang Yon Gen then finally renamed it to Kokang. The first 2 reigned as chiefs, the 3rd assumed the title of Heng which was to be held until Yang Chun Yon assumed the Myosa title. Colonel Sao Yang Wen Pin assumed the title of Saopha, after the British recognised Kokang in 1947 as a state for services in the Second World War; it lasted until the state ceased to exist in 1959.
The rulers were:
 1739–1758 Yang Shien Tsai, Chief of Shin Da Hu
 1758–1795 Yang Wei Shin, Chief of Kho Kan Shan
 1795–1840 Yang Yon Gen, Heng of Kokang
 1840–1874 Yang Guo Hwa, Heng of Kokang
 1874–1916 Yang Guo Zhen, Heng of Kokang
 1916–1927 Yang Chun Yon, Heng and Myosa of Kokang
 1927–1949 Colonel Sao Yang Wen Pin, Saopha of Kokang
 1949–1959 Sao Edward Yang Kyein Tsai, Saopha of Kokang.

Kyon

Kyawkku Hsiwan (Kyaukku)

Ngwegunhmus:
 1783–1820 Nga Kaw Tha
 1820–1821 Nga Thi Ri
 1821–1843 Nga Chit Win
 1844–1852 Nga Shwe Maung I (1st time)
 1852–1856 Nga Shwe Yit -Regent
 1856–1863 Nga Shwe Maung I (2nd time)
 1863–1865 Nga Yan Kon -Regent
 1865–1873 Nga San
 1873–1874 Nga Shwe Maung II -Regent
 1874–1876 Nga Tha U -Regent
 1876–1877 Nga Tun -Regent
 1877–1893 Nga Thaing

Laihka (Lègya)

Saophas:
 1505–1542 Sao Khrua Hpa 
 1542–1579 Hso Naw Hpa 
 1579–1609 Hso Kloung Hpa 
 1609–1628 Hso Hon Hpa 
 1628–1650 Hso Sieng Hpa 
 1650–1670 Sao San Hpa 
 1670–1687 Ngok Shin Hpa 
 1687–1702 Pong Awk Phyu 
 1702–1715 Sao Hkam Pan 
 1715–1745 Sao Perng Long 
 1745–1771 Sao Tern Möng 
 1771–1794 Sao Sai Hkam 
 1794–1803 Hkun Law Hpa 
 1803–1807 Sao Hla Hkam 
 1807–1854 Hkun Lek Hpa 
 1854–1856 Hkun Aung Hkam (Shwe Taung Kyaw)
 1856–1860 Hkun Long Kyit Hpa 
 1860–1862 Sao Hkam Möng (1st time)
 1862–1866 Hkun Hkwang Hpa 
 1866–1868 Sao Nang Kyam Faung       .... (female)
 1868–1879 Sao Hkam Möng (2nd time)
 1879–1882 Vacant
 1882–1928 Hkun Lai
 1928–1952 Sao Num

Lawksawk (Yatsauk)

Saophas 
 1450 - 1475 Hkun Paung Tai 
 1475 - 1497 Hkun Tai Hkone 
 1497 - 1507 Hkun Tai Hkam 
 1507 - 1524 Hso Hkaan Hpa 
 1524 - 1546 Hso Daan Hpa 
 1546 - 1580 Hsen Tai San Wei 
 1580 - 1610 Hso Mwe Hpa 
 1610 - 1630 Sao Sam Myo 
 1630 - 1660 Song Hkem 
 1660 - 1675 Hso Waing Hpa 
 1675 - 1707 Pai Hkam
 1707 - 1729 Shwe Kyaw
 1729 - 1753 Hkun Shwe Tha
 1753 - 1760 Tha Pan Möng 
 1760 - 1763 Maung Gyi
 1763 - 1780 Shwe Yi
 1791 - 1792 Maung Kywet
 1792 - 1811 Hkun Sam Lik
 1812 - 1813 On Gaing
 1813 - 1850 Hkun Shwe Ek
 1850 - Dec 1854 Vacant
 Dec 1854 – 1881 Sao Waing Hpa (1st time)
 1881 - 1886 Sai Pwin 
 1886 – Jan 1887 Sao Waing Hpa (2nd time)
 Jan 1887 – Oct 1887 Bo Saing -Regent
 9 Oct 1887 – 1900 Hkun Nu Mun 
 1900 - 1946 Hkun Hsuik (d.o.b. 1863)
 1943 - 1958 Hkun Saw (d.o.b 1895)

Loi-ai (Lwe-e)

Ngwegunhmus

 ....–1814 Paw Kyi
 1814–1834 Maung Shwe
 1834–1864 Kaw Thaw
 1864–1868 Maung Kaing
 1868–1870 Vacant
 1870–.... Hkun Shwe Kya

Loilong (Lwelong) Loilong (Pinlaung)

Ngwegunhmus

 ....–1854 Hkun Na                            (died 1854)
 1854–1856 Hkun San Da                        (died 1856)
 1856–1880 Hkun Pu (La Mu)                    (died 1882)

Myosas

 1880–1882 Hkun Pu (La Mu)                    (died 1882) 
 1882–1938 Hkun Hkam Chok                     (died 16 November 1938)

Loimaw (Lwemaw)

Ngwegunhmus:

 ....–1834 Maung Hpo Gok
 1834–1844 Maung Hpo Saw
 1844–1847 Maung Lok
 1847 Maung Shwe Daung
 1847–1874 Maung Shwe Pyi (1st time)
 1874–1876 Vacant
 1876–1877 Maung Kya
 12 February 1878 – 1880 Maung Meik
 1880–1886 Maung Chit
 1886 Maung At
 1886–19.. Maung Shwe Pyi (2nd time)

Manglon
Saophas (sawbwas):

 1814–1822 Hsö Hkam (Ta Awng)                 (died 1822)
 1822–1852 Sao Hkun Sang
 1852–1853 Uyaraza                            (died 1853)
 1853–1860 Naw Hpa                            (died 1860)
 1860–1881?               Tön Hsang
 1877–1892 Sao Maha (in West Manglön)
 1892–1919 Tön Hsang Hang
 1919–1946 Saw Hka Nan                        (lived 1892–1946)
 1946–1952 Sao Man Laik                       (born 1922)

Monghsu

Monglin
Saopha of Monglin
 1946–1959 Sao Hman Lek                      (died 1998)

Mongleam
Saopha of MongLeam Sao Mwamp Fa

Mongtorm
Myosa 
 1926–1952 Sao Khun Gee                     (died 1969)

Mawkmai (Maukme)
Saophas:

 1800–1818 Hsai Kyaw
 1818–1824 Awk Hkun
 1824–1831 Let To
 1831–1844 Hkam U
 1844–1867 Ko Lan (1st time)
 1867–1868 Hkum Hmôm I
 1868–1887 Ko Lan (2nd time)
 1887–1888 Hkun Hmôm II (1st time)
 March 1888 – 1888 Hkun Noi Kyu
 1888–1915 Hkun Hmôm II (2nd time)
 1915–1952 Hkun Hkaing

Mawnang (Bawnin)

Myosas

 1774–.... Maung Myat (2nd time)
 ....–.... Naw Hkam Lin
 ....–.... Maung Kaung
 ....–.... Maung Pot
 ....–.... Maung Maung
 ....–1883 Hkun Hkam
 1883–1886 Hkun Shwe Hkam -Regent
 1886–.... ....

Mawsön (Bawzaing)

Ngwegunhmus:

 1784–.... Maung Pwe
 ....–.... Maung Kyaw
 ....–.... Maung Waing
 ....–.... Maung Nyun
 1878–.... Maung Kya Ywet

Möngkawng (Mogaung)
Mong kong Mong Yawng (1st-Möngkawng) is situated in Hukawng valley, near the Uyu river. Some Tai Leng manuscripts, also, mention about the establishment of Bein Kawng (2nd-Möngkawng) on the west bank of Nam Kawng, near the Kaming but lists of Saophas has not given. 3rd-Möngkawng is situated at a distance of about 9 miles from Mogaung.

Saophas:
 603–633 Hkun Su (Youngest son of Hkun Lu) 1st-Möngkawng 
 633–653 Sao Hsen Saw (Son of Hkun Lu)
 653–667 Sao Hkun Kyaw 
 667–668 Sao Hkun Kyun
 938–9?? Sao Hkaw Hpa (2nd-Möngkawng)
 ---- – ---- Sao Haw Hseng 
 ---- – ---- Hso Saw Hpa 
 1150–1201 Sao Sam Lung Hpa Hkun Mong (3rd-Möngkawng)
 1432/1433–1445 Sao Ngan Hpa
 1445–1449 Sao Hpi Hpa 
 1449–1495 Hso Pope Hpa
 1495–1532 Kywansisa (Sao Sai Lung or Mogaung Mintayagyi)  
 1532–1557 Sao Lab Hpa (brother of Sao Sai Lung)
 1557–1567 Sao Hed Perng (son of Sao Sai Lung) 
 1567–1580 Hsawng Hkam Long Sunt (son of Sao Hed Perng)
 1580–1591 Pan Hlaing Hpa (son of Sao Lab Hpa) He rebellious and took to Bago by Mingyi Hnaung in March 1591 
 1591–1592 Pan Hlaing Lung (son of Pan Hlaing Hpa) He was hiding outside the city and confiscated the city after his father Pan Hlaing Hpa took to Bago after that he defeated the Minye Kyawswa in mid 1592 and took to Bago 
 1592–1600 Sao Ngoek Hpa (come from Mongsit) or Mongsitsa 
 1600–1629 Hso Vieng Hpa 

 1629–1645 Hso Hom Hpa 
 1645–1658 Hso Thet Hpa 
 1658–1663 Hso Tamma 

 1663–1673 Hswe Yawd
 1673–1729 Hswe Kyeik
 1729–1739 Haw Hkam
 1739–1748 Haw Hsein (1st time) (d. 1777)
 1748–1765 Ta Hkoen Möng 
 1765–1768 Haw Hseng (2nd time) 
 1768–1771 Sao Möng Kaeo 
 1771–1775 Sao Möng Pyi d. 1775 
 1775–1785 Vacant
 1785–1796 Yawd Pan Soek 

Myowuns: Most of them (except Maha Nanda Raza the Saopha of Thonze) were burmese 
 1795–1797 Mye Swane Wunmin
 1797–1799 Nga Sout Wunmin
 1799–1804 Ekkabat Myinwun
 1804–1806 Nemyo Thiri Sithu
 1806–1807 Shwedaung Letwel Kyaw
 1807–1808 Maha Nawrahta
 1808–1809 Maung Hsuan
 1809–1811 Yegaung Seintathu
 1811–1812 Shwedaung Thainkhathu and Yegaung Nawrahta
 1812–1813 Thiri Nawrahta
 1813–1814 Shwedaung Letwel Kyaw (2nd times)
 1814–1818 Nemyo Theidi Kyawdin
 1818–1819 Yedin Kyawdin
 1819–1820 Yegaung Thura
 1820–1822 Nemyo Mindin 
 1822–1824 Nemyo Yegaung Nawrahta
 1824–1826 Nemyo Htinmin
 1826–1827 Maha Nanda Raza, Saopha of Thonze (shan people) and Nemyo Zeya Kyawgaung
 1827–1828 Nemyo Minhla
 1828–1832 Nemyo Nanda Nawrahta,  Mingyi Maha Thilawa and Nemyo Zeya Kyawgaung (2nd times)
 1832–1835 Maha Thiri Kyawdin
 1835–1836 Nemyo Thiri Thihathu
 1836–1837 Nemyo Minhtin Sithu
 1837–1839 Maha Nanda Raza (shan people) the Saopha of Thonze (2nd times)
 1839–1840 U Mann
 1840–1841 U Than Twe
 1841–1845 Brother of Queen Bhamo
 1845–1846 U Than Twe (2nd times)
 1846–1848 U Mann (2nd times)
 1848–1852 U Kyan
 1852–1854 U Mann (3rd times)
 1854–1858 U Hla Paw Gyi
 1858–1859 U Yama and U Shin Gyi (Son of U Yama)
 1859–1864 U Lat
 1864–1866 U Maung
 1866–1867 U Kyae
 1867–1867 U Lat (2nd times)
 1867–1868 U Yan Shin 
 1868–1871 U Tha Hton
 1871–1873 U Moe
 1873–1875 U Shwe Aung
 1875–1877 U Hla Paw Kalay (Son of U Shwe Aung)
 1877–1882 U Boe
 1882–1883 U Si
 1883–1885 U Shwe Tha (Father of Waing Hso Saopha)
 1885–1886 U Kala (Amat of Mogaung)
 1886–1887 U Pho Saw (Son of U kala)

Mongkung

Myosa

 1835–1860 Hkun Long

Möngleng (Mohlaing)

Myosas: 
 1840?                      Kya U
 18..–1887 Hkam Leng

Mönglong

Myosas

 1813?- 1842 Hsö Han Hpa
 1842–1854 Hsö San Hpa (Hkun )
 1854–1866 Hsö Kawn Kyawng
 1866–18.. Hkun Nyon
 18..–1880 Hkun Yawt
 1880–188. Heng Nga Maung
 188.–1888 Hkun Saing (Hsawng)
 1888–1894 Hkun 
 1894–.... Sao Hke

Möngmit (Momeik)

Saophas:

 60?–6??: Hkun Han Hpa (6th son of Hkun Lu)
 939–9??: Sao Ngan Hpa 
 1122–1168: Hkun Hkam Kyen Hken Hpa 
 1168–1185: Hkun Ta Ka 
 1185–1250: Hkun Kome 
 1250–1308: Hkun Yi Khwai Hkam 
 1308–1310: Hkun Hpo Srang Kang 
 1310–1345: Hkun Tai Hkone 
 1345–1380: Hkun Tai Khaing  
 1380–1393: Hkam Plew 
 Hkam Wad Hpa 
 Hso Loeng Hkam
 Hso Kyen Möng 
 Hso Kyaung Hpa 
 Hso Hom Möng 
 1450–1487: Hso Oum Hpa 
 1487–1530: Sao Sai Möng 
 1530–1550: Hkam Hsan Hpa
 1550–1564: Ngoek Sieng Hpa 
 1564–1568: Hpong Ni Sa 
 1568–1584: Tein-nyin-sa Saing Hkan
 1584–1600: Hkam Hkon Hpa
 1600–1628: Hso Hung Hpa
 1628–1650: Sao Piam Hpa 
 Hso Hpa Pa
 Sao Ngauk Hpa
 Hso Ngan Hpa
 Sao Muak Hpa
 Hso Hon Hpa 
 Hso Han Hpa
 Hso Paad Hpa 
 Hkun Hkam Sunt 
 Hkun Hkam Loeng
 Vacant
 1830–1837; Sao Mawkmai (Sao Mei Hkam)
 1837–1851: Sao Möng Einth  
 1851–1858: Sao Hkun Te
 1858–1861: Sao Haw Kyin
 1862–1868: Sao Möng Nyunt 
 1868–1874: Sao Hkam Möng 
 1874–1886: Vacant
 1886–1887: Sao Hkam Loeng 
 31 January 1887 – 3 February 1937: Sao Khine Möng Kwe 
 3 February 1937 – 1952: Sao Hkun Hkio (b. 1912)

Mong Nai (Monè)

Saophas:

 1312–1339 Khun Khrua 
 1542–1557 Hso Pak Hpa 
 1557–1573 Hso Piam Hpa
 1573–1585 Vacant
 1585–1631 Representative of Myanmar officers
 1631–1675 Sao Hla Hkam (son of Saopha of Momeik)
 1675–1678 Sao Kyam Hkam (son of Sao Hla Hkam)
 1678–1704 Sao Hso Hom (son of Sao Kyam Hkam)
 1704–1728 Sao Hkun Arn (son of Sao Hso Hom)
 1728–1746 Sao Hso Hkam (son of Sao Hkun Arn)
 1746–1772 Shwe Myat Noe (son of Sao Hso Hkam)
 1772–1790 Shwe Myat Kyaw (son of Shwe Myat Noe)
 1790–1811 Hkun Shwe Wa (son of Shwe Myat Kyaw)
 1811–1842 Hkun Hsen Kyung (son of Sao Maha Hpom Saopha of Kyaingtong)
 1842–1852 Hkun Nu Nom (son of Hkun Kyung)
 1852–1875 Hkun Hpo On (son of Hkun Nu Nom)
 1875–1882 Hkun Kyi (1st time) the uncle of Hkun Hpo On
 1882–1888 Twet Nga Lu (usurper) (d. 1888)
 1888–1914 Hkun Kyi (2nd time) the uncle of Hkun Hpo On
 6 May 1914–1928 Hkun Kyaw Sam
 1928–1949 Hkun Kyaw Ho
 1949–1958 Sao Pyea (last Saopha of Mone')

Mongnawng

Myosas: 
 1851–1866 Heng Awn
 1866–1868 Hkun Hkang
 1868–19.. Hkun Tun

Mong Pai (Mobye)
Saophas: 
 1434 - 1449 Bod Hsang Hom Hkam 
 1449 - 1472 Hsan Meik Hpa Hom 
 1472 - 1510 Hso Nyunt Hpa 
 1510 - 1542 Hso Kyaung Hpa 
 1542 - 1545 Hso Kaw Hpa 
 1545 - 1581 Naw Hsan Hpa 
 1581 - 1614 Lo Hseng Han 
 1614 - 1636 Hso Hsawng Möng  
 1636 - 1661 Hkam Kyen Hpa 
 1661 - 1685 Sai Hkam Mung 
 1685 - 1692 Maing Yin (d. 1692)
 1692 - 1759 Vacant
 1759 - c.1763 Nga Hte Mang
Rulers (title Saohpa; ritual style Kambawsa Mahawuntha Thiridamaraza)
 c.1763 - 1766 Thi Gyit
 1766 - 17.. Ye Kyan Dewa (1st time)
 17.. - 1783 Sao Dwant Wad  
 1783 - 1803 Ye Kyan Dewa (2nd time)
 1803 - 1805 Hkun Pya
 1805 - 1808 Hkan Maung
 1808 - 1820 Hkan Hlaing (1st time) (d. 1836)
 1820 - 1823 Nga Kyi -Regent
 1823 - Jul 1836 Hkan Hlaing (2nd time) 
 Jul 1836 - 1890 Hkun Yon (b. 18.. - d. 1900)
 1890 - 30 Dec 1907 Hkun Hsuriya                      (b. 1852 - d. 1907)
 1890 - 1900 Hkun Yon -Regent                  (s.a.)
 26 May 1908 - 1952/59 Sao Hkun Ping Nya                 (b. 1881 - d. 19..)

Möngpan 
Myosas:

 ....–1808 Naw Hkam
 1809–1823 Mana Ne Myo
 1823–1858 Maung Shwe Hkam
 1858–1867 Hkun Tun U

Saophas
 1867–1886 Hkun Tun U
 1886–.... Hkun Leng
 1918–1952 Hkun On

Mong Pawn (Maing Pun)
Myosas:

 1816–1860 Hkun Lek
 1860–1880 Hkun Ti

Saophas:
 1880–1928 Hkun Ti
 1928 – 19 Jul 1947 Sao Sam Htun (died 1947)
 1947–1952 Sao Hso Hom

Möngping (Maingpyin)
After 1842 this state was occupied by Lawksawk.

Rulers :
 1835–1842 Hkam Hlaing
 1842–.... Hkam Kaw

Möngsit (Maingseik)

Myosas 
 1816–18.. ....
 18..–1857 Sao Haw Pik
 1857–18.. Hkun Kyaw San
 18..–1873 Hkun Lu
 1873–1876 ....
 1876–1880 ....
 1880–1883 Vacant
 1883–.... Hkam Pwin

Möngtung (Maington)
This state was occupied by Hsenwi between 1886 and 1888.

Myosas: 
 ....–.... Hkun Sang Kang
 ....–.... Hkun Kyaw Htam
 ....–1886 Hkun 
 1888–1896 Hkun Lun
 1896–19.. Haw Yawt

Möngyang (Mohnyin)
State existed before 1400 and after 1604 .

Saophas:
 60?–6?? Hkun Hpa (2nd son of Hkun Lu)
 940–964 Sao Kyan Hpa 
 1390–1410 Hso Kyaung Hpa 
 1410–1430 Hso Ngaan Hpa 
 1430–1451 Hso Taan Hpa 
 1451–1486 Hso Bok Hpa 
 2 April 1486–1533 Hso Kyen Hpa 
 1533–1567 Sao Möng Hkam 
 1567–1603 Sao Pha Hkam 
 1603–1629 Hso Htin Hpa  
 1629–1652 Hso Ngaan Hpa 
 1652–1674 Hso Ngam Möng 
 1674–1697 Hso Hkan Hpa 
 1697–1713 Hso Oum Hpa 
 1713–1733 Hso Hkam Hpa 
 1733–1753 Hso Ka Hpa 
 1753–1773 Hso Han Hpa 
 1773–1793 Sao Kyam Hkam 
 1793–1805 Sao Pan Hkam 
 1805–1816 Hkam Hlaing Hpa  
 1816–1833 Sao Haw Lik 
 1833–1845 Sao Pan Serk 
 1845–1876 Sao Hsan Hpa 
 1876–1924 Sao Hla Hkam (last saopha) 

Myowuns:
 1853–18?? Nemyo Minhtin Themanta Yaza (Six Myowuns – Mohnyin, Kawng Ton, Shwegu, Moe Ta, Yin khia, Kat )

Möngyawng

Myosas: 
 17..–.... Inta Wasai
 ....–.... ?
 ....–.... Hsen Sulin (Surin Pumintha)
 ....–.... Hsai Ya Kuman
 ....–.... Sao Yawt

Namhkai (Nanke)

Ngwegunhmus: 
 1808–18.. Nga Dammaa
 18..–1867 Hkun Pe                            (died 1867)
 1867–1874 Hkun Pan (1st time)                (died 1891)
 1874–1876 Vacant
 1876–1888 Hkun Hwaing
 1888 – 13 Jan 1891 Hkun Pan (2nd time)
 1891–19.. Hkun Kye

Namhkok (Nankok)

Myosas: 
....–.... ....

Namhkom (Nankon)

Rulers: 
....–.... ....

Namtok (Nantok)

Rulers: 
 ....–.... Maung Shwe Tha
 ....–1816 Tha Zan                            (died 1816)
 1816–18.. Maung Yi

Ngegunhmus: 
 18..–18.. Maung Yi
 18..–18.. Hkun Taw
 18..–18.. Hkun Pwe
 18..–18.. Hkun Pwang
 18..–18.. Hkun Hmam
 18.. –  9 Oct 1892 Hkun Pu                            (died 1892)
 1892–.... Hkun Maung

Namkhok-Nawngwawn
Sao Tun Yean WW2
Sao Noi Nyin

Panglawng

Pangmi
Sao Khun Min

Pangtara (Pindara)

Ngwegunhmus: 

 1420–1444 Sao Hkam Hpong 
 1444–1468 Sao Man Hseng 
 1468–1502 Sao Vieng Hpang
 1502–1534 Sao Vieng Sang Hpa 
 1534–1574 Sao Man Lung 
 1574–1605 Sao Lik Hpa 
 1605–1624 Sao Larb Hseng Sandi
 1624–1644 Sao Larb Hpa 
 1644–1663 Sao Yad Hpa 
 1663–1687 Sao Sam Hkè Hpa
 1687–1705 Sao Lik Man Lung 
 1705–1721 Sao Lak Hti 
 1721–1740 Hso Hen Doen 
 1740–1761 Sao Heb Hpa 
 1761–1782 Sao Hkem Möng 
 1782–1796 Vacant 
 1796–1802 Sao Than Hpa 
 1802–1809 Sao Hpi Hpa I
 1809–1819 Sao Möng Khant Oo 
 1819–1843 Sao Shwe Meik
 1843–1847 Sao Nang Thiri Thantha (f)
 1847–1850 Sao Hpo Aek Hpa 
 1850–1851 Maung Shwe Thi (burmese) -Regent
 1851–1857 Sao Myat Hpu
 1857–1859 Sao Hpi Hpa II
 1859–1860 Sao Hlaing Ya (1st time)
 1860–1861 Sao Hpong Kone Sam  
 1862–1868 Hso Than Hpa II (1st time) -Regent
 1868–1869 Sao Hlaing Ya (2nd time)
 1869–1871 Hso Than Hpa II (2nd time)
 1871–1877 Vacant
 1877–1878 Sao Hlaing Ya (3rd time)
 1878–1880 Vacant
 1880–188. Sao Hlaing Ya (4th time)
 188.–1888 Vacant
 1888 –  6 Jan 1897 Sao Hpo Hkin                     (died 1897)
 1897–1938 Sao San Noi                                (died 9 November 1938)
 Latest Sao Win Kyi (died 2007)

Poila (Pwehla)

Myosas:
Khun Soe Min

Sakoi

Myosas:

 ....–1877 Hkun ....
 1877–.... Hkun Ton

Samka

Myosas:

 ....–1838 Hkun Ye
 1838–1858 Hkun Sun (1st time)
 1858–1860 Hkun Noi (1st time)
 1860–1872 Hkun Sun (2nd time)
 1873–1876 Sao Sein Bu (1st time)
 1876–1883 Hkun Noi (2nd time)
 1883–1885 Hkun Pwin
 December 1885 – 1915 Sao Sein Bu (2nd time)
 1915–1952 Hkun Kyi

Saophas (Kyamine-prince):
 1915–1952 Sao Soe Kyi

Tawngpeng

Saophas:

 1753–1759 Ta Dwe Ba
 1760–1764 Ba Hkun Mya
 1764–1775 Ba Hkun Saing
 1775–1781 Ba Dwe Taw
 1781 Ba Loi Lio
 1781–1819 Ba Hkun Kein Möng
 1819–1837 Ba Hkun Hso
 1837–1846 Ba Hkun Tan Möng
 1847 –  4 Sep 1856 Shwe Ok Hka (Shwe Taung Kyaw)
 1856–1865 Hkun  (Ba Hkam Hkun Shinye)
 1865–1868 Aung Tha
 1868–1877 Kwan Kon
 1877–1887 Hkun Hkam Möng
 1888–1897 Hkam Tan Möng (Hkun Kyan)
 1897–1926 Hkun Hsan Gawn
 Aug 1926 – 1952 Hkun Pan Sing

Wanmaw (Bhamo)

This state existed 1470–1772, when it was incorporated into Burma.

Saophas 
 955: Hkun Hkam Hseng
 1470–1492: Sao Naw Hpa 
 1492–1506: Hso Wad Hpa (b. Hkun Naw Hkam) 
 1506–1517: Hso Hkoen Hpa 
 1517–1534: Naw Jad Hpa 
 1534–1540: Hso Hkam Hpa 
 1540–1549: Hso Hpoek Hpa 
 1549–1574: Ngawk Chew Hpa 
 1574–1601: Awk Htong Lung Sunt 
 1601–1643: U Thit Hpa 
 1643–1685: Sao Ngawk Hpa
 1685–1706: Sao Hpi Hpa
 1706–1719: Sao Mauk Hpa
 1719–1720: Hpo U
 1720–1727: Sao Muak Hpa
 1727–1734: Sao Tung Ngai I (d. 1734)
 1734–1735: Vacant
 1735–1742: Kit Haw
 1742–1770: Sao Tung Ngai II
 1770–1772: Sao Moud Aung (b. 1690 – c. 1772)

Myowuns:
 1772–17??: Mingyi Wailuthaya (U Shwe Ye)
 1853–18??: Mingyi Maha Minhtin Yaza
 1878–18??: U Pho Hla

Wanyin (Banyin) 

Rulers:

 1865–1874 Hkun Saw

Myosas: 
 1874–1893 Hkun Saw
 1893 – Jul 1897 Hkun Long
 1897–19.. Hkun Han

Waing Hso (Wynn Tho)

Saophas:
 941–955 Sao Hon Hpa 
 955–?? Paung Hpa 
 1382–1384 Paung Kiao  
 1384–1414 Paung Hkam 
 1414–1434 Hso Hkloung Hpa 
 1434–1465 Saw Nyi 
 1465–1481 Hso Wen Hpa 
 1481–1504 Hso Paad Hpa 
 1504–1534 Hso Hkam Hpa 
 1534–1558 Soi Lod Hpa 
 1558–1583 Tian Sieng Hpa 
 1583–1592 Pha Lod Hpa from Kyawkku Hsiwan (Kyaukku, Myinkyadu)
 1592–1599 Town Hso Yen 
 1599–1619 Tein-nyin-sa Saing Hkan
 1619–16?? Thakin Kaw Nyo
 16??–1647 Sao Inn Möng 
 1647–1671 Kruea Hsan Hpa (come from Mongsit)
 1671–1697 Kye Möng U Kyaung (Son of Kruea Hsan Hpa)
 1697–1697 Maung Kyin Baw
 1697–1702 Maung Sun 
 1702–1714 Kyaung Pyn 
 1714–1736 Mei Kiao (Son of Kye Möng U Kyaung)
 1736–1751 Vacant 
 1751–1756 Talaings 
 1756–1778 Okka Nara (Brother of Mei Kiao)
 1778–1796 Sao Tim Hpa
 1796–1798 Town San Hkam (Brother of Sao Tim Hpa)
 1798–1827 Maung Tha Ywe (administrator to 1802)
 1827–1830 Hkam Thaan Hpa  
 1830–1833 Hso Ngaan Hpa
 1833–1849 Haw Hkam Hung Thit
 1849–1851 San Thit Hpa 
 1852–1866 Hkam Thad Hpa (d. af.1891)
 1866–1878 Hso Hon Hpa 
 1878– 7 Feb 1891 Hso U (Son of Hkam Tha Hpa) – Last Saopha of Waing Hso (b. 1857 - d. af.1909)

Yawnghwe (Nyaungshwe)

The formal and the ritual name of the state was Kambosarattha, in short term Kanbawza. The rulers full titular style was Kambawsarahta Thiri Pawaramahawuntha Thudamaraza. For the state capital see Nyaung Shwe.

Saophas 
 1359 - 1384 Nga Taung  
 1384 - 1400 Nga Naung 
 Nga Sa Mauk 
 Mauk Hkam 
 Ai Hso Yen 
 1497 - 1510 Hkun Ai from Kyaing Taung 
 1510 - 1522 Kiao Lan Hom 
 1522 - 1532 Hkam Ai Lan 
 1532 - 1562 Nga Thein Hpa 
 1562 - 1590 Shwe Sayan  
 1590 - 1607 Haw Lung Hkam Hlaing Hpa 
 1607 - 1615 Sai Mauk Hpa 
 1615 - 1634 Kiao Hsan Hpa  
 1634 - 1647 Hsa Hung Hpa 
 1647 - 1667 Hkun Hpong Hpa  
 1667 - 1675 Hso Sieng Hpa 
 1675 - 1695 Hkam Hsawng Hpa 
 1695 - 1733 Hkam Leng Hpa 
 1733 - 1737 Htawk Sha Sa	
 1737 - 1746 Hsi Ton Sa	
 1746 - 1758 Hke Hsa Wa	
 1758 - 1758 Naw Mong I	
 1758 - 1761 Yawt Hkam	
 1761 - 1762 Hpong Hpa Ka-sa	
 1762 - 1815 Sao Yun	
 1815 - 1818 Sao Hso U I	
 1818 - 1821 Naw Mong II	
 1821 - 1852 Sao Hso U II	
 1852 - 1858 Sao Hso Hom	(d. 1858)
 1858 - 1864 Sao Naw Hpa	
 23 Oct 1864 - 1885 Sao Maung (1st time)	(b. 1848 - d. 1927)
 1886 - 1897 Sao Ohn	
 1897 - Dec 1926 Sao Maung (2nd time)	(s.a.) (from 19.., Sir Sao Maung)
 Sep 1927 - 1952 Sao Hkam Suek aka Sao Shwe Thaik (b. 1896 - d. 1962) 33rd Saopha (The First President of Burma)

Yengan (Ywangan)

Ngwegunhmus: 
c.1857 - 1860 Maung Htun Lin                     (d. c.1864)
1861 - 1886 Maung Nyo Sein                     (d. 1886)
1886 Maung Thu Daw (1st time)           (b. 1878 - d. 19..)
1886 (10 days)             Mi Thaung (f) 
1896 (25 days)             Maung Chit + Heng Yin Yo
1887 - 19.. Maung Thu Daw (2nd time)           (s.a.)
1887 - May 1898            .... -Regent

Hkam Ti (Zinkaling)

Saophas:
 1820–1844 Saw Nyi Kawng
 1844–1853 Saw Ai
 1853–1882 Saw Hi
 1887–1892 Saw Ni Taung
 1892–1898 Saw Hon(Po Hlaing)(Cousin of Saw Ni Taung)
 1898–19?? Ma Pu(Sister of Saw Hon)
 19??–1952 Saw Mya Sein(Last Saopha)

Bibliography & External links 
 Sao Sāimöng, The Shan States and the British Annexation. Cornell University, Cornell, 1969 (2nd ed.)
 Sao Sāimöng Mangrāi, The Pādaeng Chronicle and the Jengtung State Chronicle Translated. University of Michigan, Ann Arbor, 1981
 J. G. Scott, Gazetteer of Upper Burma and the Shan States. 5 vols. Rangoon, 1900–1901
 J. G. Scott, Burma: a handbook of practical information. London, 1906
 Shan States and Karenni List of Chiefs and Leading Families (corrected up to 1939), Government of India Press, Simla, 1943
 E. R. Leach (1954). The Political System of Highland Burma.

 WorldStatesmen - Myanmar(Burma)- Shan&Karenni states

•
Shan